The 2022 Classic Brugge–De Panne (known as Minerva Classic Brugge–De Panne for sponsorship reasons) was a road cycling one-day race that took place on 23 March 2022 in Belgium. It was the 46th edition of the Three Days of Bruges–De Panne, and the 8th event of the 2022 UCI World Tour.

Teams
Twenty-four teams were invited to the race, including sixteen UCI WorldTeams and eight UCI ProTeams. All but four teams entered the maximum allowed seven riders. Of the 164 riders who were entered into the race, there were 154 finishers and five non-starters.

UCI WorldTeams

 
 
 
 
 
 
 
 
 
 
 
 
 
 
 
 

UCI ProTeams

Result

References

Classic Brugge–De Panne
Classic Brugge–De Panne
Classic Brugge–De Panne
Three Days of Bruges–De Panne